In numerical analysis, the Shanks transformation is a non-linear series acceleration method to increase the rate of convergence of a sequence. This method is named after Daniel Shanks, who rediscovered this sequence transformation in 1955. It was first derived and published by R. Schmidt in 1941.

Formulation

For a sequence  the series

is to be determined. First, the partial sum  is defined as:

and forms a new sequence . Provided the series converges,  will also approach the limit  as 
The Shanks transformation  of the sequence  is the new sequence defined by

where this sequence  often converges more rapidly than the sequence    
Further speed-up may be obtained by repeated use of the Shanks transformation, by computing   etc.

Note that the non-linear transformation as used in the Shanks transformation is essentially the same as used in Aitken's delta-squared process so that as with Aitken's method, the right-most expression in 's definition (i.e. ) is more numerically stable than the expression to its left (i.e. ). Both  Aitken's method and the Shanks transformation operate on a sequence, but the sequence the Shanks transformation operates on is usually thought of as being a sequence of partial sums, although any sequence may be viewed as a sequence of partial sums.

Example

As an example, consider the slowly convergent series

which has the exact sum π ≈ 3.14159265. The partial sum  has only one digit accuracy, while six-figure accuracy requires summing about 400,000 terms.

The figure to the right shows the absolute error for the partial sums and Shanks transformation results, clearly showing the improved accuracy and convergence rate.
 

The Shanks transformation  already has two-digit accuracy, while the original partial sums only establish the same accuracy at  Remarkably,  has six digits accuracy, obtained from repeated Shank transformations applied to the first seven terms  As said before,  only obtains 6-digit accuracy after about summing 400,000 terms.

Motivation

The Shanks transformation is motivated by the observation that — for larger  — the partial sum  quite often behaves approximately as

with  so that the sequence converges transiently to the series result  for 

These three equations contain three unknowns:   and  Solving for  gives

In the (exceptional) case that the denominator is equal to zero: then  for all

Generalized Shanks transformation

The generalized kth-order Shanks transformation is given as the ratio of the determinants:

with  It is the solution of a model for the convergence behaviour of the partial sums  with  distinct transients:

This model for the convergence behaviour contains  unknowns. By evaluating the above equation at the elements  and solving for  the above expression for the kth-order Shanks transformation is obtained. The first-order generalized Shanks transformation is equal to the ordinary Shanks transformation: 

The generalized Shanks transformation is closely related to Padé approximants and Padé tables.

Note: The calculation of determinants requires many arithmetic operations to make, however Peter Wynn discovered a recursive evaluation procedure called epsilon-algorithm which avoids to calculate the determinants.

See also
Aitken's delta-squared process
Anderson acceleration
Rate of convergence
Richardson extrapolation
Sequence transformation

Notes

References

 
  
 

Numerical analysis
Asymptotic analysis
Iterative methods